Matthew McConaughey is an American actor and producer who rose to prominence with his role in the 1993 ensemble comedy film Dazed and Confused. The film was well received by critics. Since then, McConaughey has received various awards and nominations, including an Academy Award, a Golden Globe, a Screen Actors Guild Award, two Critics' Choice Awards, an MTV Movie Award and a People’s Choice Award. He has also been nominated for five Teen Choice Awards and two Emmys.

Three years after his role in Dazed and Confused, in 1996, McConaughey played the lead role of a lawyer in the movie A Time to Kill, for which he won the MTV Movie Award for Best Breakthrough Performance. His next appearances—in the science fiction drama Contact (1997), alongside Jodie Foster, and the war film U-571 (2000)—garnered him two Blockbuster Entertainment Award nominations. In the early 2000s, he starred in multiple romantic comedies, including The Wedding Planner (2001) and How to Lose a Guy in 10 Days (2003), for which he received four Teen Choice Award nominations. He received two more nominations and the People's Choice Award for Favorite Male Action Star for his role in the 2005 action-comedy film Sahara.

McConaughey received the National Society of Film Critics Award for Best Supporting Actor for his role in Bernie (2011) and Magic Mike (2012) and was also awarded the Critics' Choice Movie Award in the same category for the latter. He played the role of a hit man in the black comedy crime film Killer Joe (2011) for which he was awarded the Saturn Award for Best Actor. In the same year, McConaughey starred in Mud (2012), which earned him the Independent Spirit Robert Altman Award. The following year, McConaughey played lead role of Ron Woodroof, a real life AIDS patient in the 1980s, in the biopic drama Dallas Buyers Club to critical acclaim. He won the Academy Award, Critics' Choice Movie Award, Golden Globe and a Screen Actors Guild Award for his role in the film. In 2014, he starred in the epic sci-fi Interstellar for which he received a Saturn Award for Best Actor nomination. In November of the same year, he was inducted to the Hollywood Walk of Fame.  McConaughey co-produced and acted in the crime anthology television series True Detective, which earned him Critics' Choice Television Award and a Golden Globe nomination. He also received two Primetime Emmy nominations, one for his role as an actor and other for his role as an executive producer, and a Producers Guild of America Award nomination. For his roles in the war film Free State of Jones and Gold (both 2016), he was nominated for the Women Film Critics Circle Award for Best Actor and the Saturn Award for Best Actor, respectively.

Awards and nominations

Other honors

References

Notes

Sources

External links
 List of awards and nominations at the Internet Movie Database

McConaughey, Matthew